Kurt Morath (born 13 November 1984) is a New Zealand-born Tongan rugby union player who plays at fly-half. He currently plays for the Austin Gilgronis in Major League Rugby (MLR).

He previously played for Doncaster Knights in RFU Championship Morath was part of the Tonga squad at the 2011, 2015 and 2019 Rugby World Cup.

Early life
Morath was born in North Shore City, New Zealand. As a junior he played rugby league alongside former New Zealand Warriors five eighth Lance Hohaia. In 2005, Morath was selected in the New Zealand Under-21 extended squad alongside other notable New Zealand players such as Andrew Ellis.

Professional career
In early 2016, Morath signed to the San Diego Breakers in the newly formed PRO Rugby competition.

At the start of the 2018-19 rugby season, he signed for Doncaster Knights in the English Championship, after playing for the Utah Warriors of Major League Rugby in the 2018 season. He then returned to the MLR to play for the Austin Gilgronis in 2020.

References

External links 
 ESPN profile
 2011 Rugby World Cup Profile

1984 births
Living people
Biarritz Olympique players
Expatriate rugby union players in France
Expatriate rugby union players in the United States
New Zealand sportspeople of Tongan descent
New Zealand rugby union players
New Zealand expatriate rugby union players
New Zealand expatriate sportspeople in France
New Zealand expatriate sportspeople in the United States
New Zealand expatriate sportspeople in England
Rugby union players from Auckland
San Diego Breakers players
Taranaki rugby union players
Tonga international rugby union players
Utah Warriors players
Rugby union fly-halves
Auckland rugby union players
Kubota Spears Funabashi Tokyo Bay players
Doncaster Knights players
Austin Gilgronis players
People from Takapuna